Churches can be measured and compared in several different ways. These include area, volume, length, width, height, or capacity. Several churches individually claim to be "the largest church", which may be due to any one of these criteria.

Criteria for inclusion
 The reason the edifice was built was for Christian religious services (see Church (building) for more detail)
 Entries are included even if they currently do not function as a church. For example, the Hagia Sophia is included; it was originally built as a church but currently operates as a mosque. 
 Buildings that have become churches, but which were not built for that purpose, are not included; for example, the Lakewood Church building, which was originally built to be the Compaq Center.
 The building must still be standing.
 Internal floor area is measured to the internal face of the external walls.
 External floor area is measured to the external face of the external walls.
 A reliable source is present that states the building's area.
 Not a Shrine, Tabernacle, Temple, or any other structures that function separately from a church.

{| class="wikitable sortable" style="font-size: 95%"
|-
! rowspan=2 | Name
! data-sort-type="number" colspan=2 | Area (m2)
! data-sort-type="number" rowspan=2 | Gross volume (m³)
! data-sort-type="number" rowspan=2 | Capacity
! data-sort-type="number" rowspan=2 | Built
! rowspan=2 | City
! rowspan=2 | Country
! rowspan=2 | Denomination
! rowspan=2 class="unsortable" | Notes
|-
! Interior
! Exterior
|-
| St. Peter's Basilica
| 15,160
| 21,095
| 5,000,000
| 60,000 standing, or 20,000 seated
| 1506–1626 
| Vatican City
| 
| Catholic (Latin)
| Largest church in the world 
|-
| Cathedral Basilica of Our Lady Aparecida
| 12,000
| 18,331
| 1,200,000
| 30,000
| 1955–1980
| Aparecida
| 
| Catholic (Latin)
|Largest cathedral in the world.
|-
| Seville Cathedral
| 11,520+
| 23,500
| 500,000+
|
| 1401–1528
| Seville
| 
| Catholic (Latin)
| Largest cathedral in Europe and the largest Gothic religious building in the world. It was a mosque before being rebuilt as a Catholic cathedral.
|-
| Mosque-Cathedral of Córdoba
| 
| 13,900
|
|
| 785–1607
| Córdoba
| 
| Catholic (Latin)
| 
|-
| Milan Cathedral
| 11,700
|
| 440,000
| 40,000
| 1386–1965 
| Milan 
|
|  
| 
|-
| Cathedral of St. John the Divine
| 11,241
|
| 480,000
| 8,600
| 1892–present 
| New York City 
| 
| Anglican (Episcopal Church in the U.S.) 
| Unfinished.
|-
| Basilica of Our Lady of Licheń
| 10,090
|
| 300,000
|
| 1994–2004
| Licheń Stary 
| 
| Catholic (Latin) 
| 9,240 m2 or 10,090 m2
|-
| Liverpool Cathedral
| 9,687
|
| 450,000 + 
| 3,500
| 1904–1978 
| Liverpool 
|
| Anglican (Church of England)
|
|-
| Basilica of the Holy Trinity
| 8,700
|
| 130,000 
| 9,000
| 2004–2007
| Fátima 
| 
| Catholic (Latin) 
| Area given as 12,000m²
|-
| Basilica of Saint Paul Outside the Walls
| 8,515
|
|
|
| 4th–5th century; rebuilt 1825–1929 
| Rome 
| 
| Catholic (Latin) 
|
|-
| Basilica-Cathedral of Our Lady of the Pillar
| 8,318
|
|
|
| 1681–1872 
| Zaragoza 
| 
| Catholic (Latin) 
|
|-
| Florence Cathedral
| 8,300
|
|
|
| 1296–1436 
| Florence 
| 
| Catholic (Latin) 
|
|-
| Basilica of Our Lady of Guadalupe
| 8,167
|
|
| 10,000
| 1974–1976 
| Mexico City 
| 
| Catholic (Latin) 
| Circular base of 102 m in diameter
|-
| Cathedral of Our Lady
| 8,000
|
|
|
| 1352–1521
| Antwerp
| 
| Catholic (Latin)
|
|-
| Rio de Janeiro Cathedral
| 8,000
|
|
| 20,000
| 1964–1976
| Rio de Janeiro
| 
| Catholic (Latin)
|
|-
| Basilica of the Sacred Heart
| 8,000
|
|
|
| 1905–1970 
| Koekelberg (Brussels)
| 
| Catholic (Latin) 
|
|-
| Basilica of Our Lady of Peace
| 7,989
| 30,000
|
| 18,000
| 1985–1989
| Yamoussoukro 
| 
| Catholic (Latin) 
| The basilica proper is 7,989 m2. Exterior area includes rectory and villa.
|-
| Hagia Sophia
| 7,960
|
| 255,800
|
| 532–537 
| Istanbul 
| 
| Eastern Orthodox (Greek) 
| Byzantine church constructed in 537; converted to a mosque.
|-
| San Petronio Basilica
| 7,920
|
| 258,000
| 28,000
| 1390–1479
| Bologna
| 
| Catholic (Latin) 
|
|-
| Cologne Cathedral
| 7,914
|
| 407,000
|
| 1248–1880 
| Cologne 
| 
| Catholic (Latin) 
|
|-
| St Paul's Cathedral
| 7,875
|
|
|
| 1677–1708 
| London 
| 
| Anglican (Church of England) 
|
|-
| Washington National Cathedral
| 7,712
|
|
|
| 1907–1990
| Washington, DC 
| 
| Anglican (Episcopal Church in the U.S.) 
|
|-
| Amiens Cathedral
| 7,700
| 7,700
| 200,000 (interior only)
|
| 1220–1270 
| Amiens 
| 
| Catholic (Latin) 
| Gross volume slightly below 400,000
|-
| Abbey of Santa Giustina
| 7,700
|
|
|
| 1501–1606
| Padua
| 
| Catholic (Latin) 
|
|-
| Cathedral of the Nativity
| 7,500
|
| 135,000
| 8,200
| 2017–2019 
| Cairo 
| 
| Oriental Orthodox (Coptic) 
| Largest Oriental Orthodox church in the world
|-
| Yoido Full Gospel
| 7,450 (estimated) 
| 44,000+
|
| 12,000
| 1973
| Seoul
| 
| Protestant (Pentecostal)
| Largest Pentecostal church
|-
| St. Vitus Cathedral
| 7,440
|
|
|
| 1344–1929 
| Prague 
|  
| Catholic (Latin)
|
|-
| Basilica Natn. Shrine of the Immaculate Conception
| 
| 
|
| 10,000
| 1920–2017
| Washington, DC
| 
| Catholic (Latin)
| Interior area only for the upper church / upper floor.
|-
| Cathedral of La Plata
| 6,968
|
|
|
| 1884–1932 
| La Plata
| 
| Catholic (Latin) 
| Largest church in Argentina
|-
| Saint Joseph's Oratory
| 6,825
|
|
|
| 1904–1967 
| Montreal 
| 
| Catholic (Latin) 
| The largest church in Canada
|-
| Shrine of St. Paulina
| 6,740
| 9,000
|
| 6,000
| 2003–2006
| Nova Trento
| 
| Catholic (Latin)
|
|-
| Mexico City Metropolitan Cathedral
| 6,732
|
|
|
| 1573–1813 
| Mexico City 
| 
| Catholic (Latin) 
|
|-
| Chartres Cathedral
| 6,700
| 10,875
|
|
| 1145–1220 
| Chartres
| 
| Catholic (Latin) 
|
|-
| Berlin Cathedral or Berliner Dom
| 6,270 
|
|
| 2,000+
| 1451–1905
| Berlin 
| 
| Protestant (Lutheran) 
| 116 meters high & 73 meters wide; city landmark.
|-
| Cathedral of Saint Paul (Minnesota)
|
| 6,200 (estimated)
|
|
| 1906–1915
| St Paul, Minnesota
| 
| Catholic (Latin) 
|
|-
| Cathedral of Our Lady of the Angels
| 6,038
|
|
|
| 1998–2002 
| Los Angeles 
| 
| Catholic (Latin) 
|
|-
| De Hoeksteen
| 6,020
|
| 43,300 
| 2,531
| 2007–2008
| Barneveld 
| 
| Protestant (Calvinist) 
|
|-
| People's Salvation Cathedral
| 6,000
|
| 323,000
| 7,000
| 2010–present
| Bucharest 
|  
| Eastern Orthodox (Romanian) 
| Tallest and largest (by volume) Orthodox church building in the world.
|-
| Padre Pio Pilgrimage Church
| 6,000
|
|
| 6,500
| 1991–2004 
| San Giovanni Rotondo
| 
| Catholic (Latin) 
| Vaulted church holding 6,500 seats
|-
| Ulm Minster
| 5,950
|
| 190,000 
| 2,000
| 1377–1890 
| Ulm 
| 
| Protestant (Lutheran) 
| Tallest church in the world
|-
| York Minster
| 5,927
|
|
|
| 1230–1472
| York
| 
| Anglican (Church of England)
| Largest Gothic cathedral in Northern Europe. 
|-
| Bourges Cathedral
| 5,900
|
|
|
| 1195–1230 
| Bourges
| 
| Catholic (Latin) 
|
|-
| Reims Cathedral
| 5,800
| 6,650
|
|
| 1211–1275 
| Reims
| 
| Catholic (Latin) 
| The longest church in France at 149.17m
|-
| São Paulo Cathedral
| 5,700
|
|
| 8,000
| 1913–1954
| São Paulo
| 
| Catholic (Latin)
|
|-
| Esztergom Basilica
| 5,660
|
|
|
| 1822–1869 
| Esztergom 
| 
| Catholic (Latin) 
|
|-
| Diocesan Sanctuary of Our Lady of Guadalupe
| 5,414.58
|
|
|
| 1898–2008
| Zamora, Michoacán 
| 
| Catholic (Latin) 
| Co-cathedral church of the diocese of Zamora.
|-
| Sagrada Familia
| 5,400
|
|
| 9,000
| 1882–present 
| Barcelona 
| 
| Catholic (Latin) 
| Unfinished; expected complete sometime after 2026.
|-
| Strasbourg Cathedral
| 5,300
| 6,044
|
|
| 1015–1439 
| Strasbourg 
| 
| Catholic (Latin) 
| World's tallest building from 1647 to 1874
|-
| Primate Cathedral of Bogotá
| 5,300
|
|
|
| 1807–1823 
| Bogotá
| 
| Catholic (Latin) 
|
|-
| Palma Cathedral
| 5,200
|
| 160,000 (interior) 
|
| 1220–1346 
| Palma, Majorca
| 
| Catholic (Latin) 
|
|-
| New Cathedral, Linz
| 5,170
|
|
| 20,000
| 1862–1924 
| Linz 
| 
| Catholic (Latin) 
|
|-
| Speyer Cathedral 
| 5,038
|
|
|
| 1030–1103
| Speyer
| 
| Catholic (Latin)
| Added to the UNESCO World Heritage List
|-
| Provo ward conference center
| 5,038
|
|
|
| 2012 
| Provo, Utah 
| 
| The Church of Jesus Christ of Latter-day Saints 
|
|-
| Westminster Cathedral
| 5,017
|
|
| 3,000
| 1895–1910 
| London 
| 
| Catholic (Latin)
| Largest Roman Catholic Church in the UK. 
|-
| Medak Cathedral
| 5,000
|
|
|
| 1914–1926 
| Medak 
| 
| Anglican (Church of South India) 
|
|-
| Lincoln Cathedral
| 5,000 (estimated)
|
|
|
| 1185–1311
| Lincoln, England
| 
| Anglican (Church of England)
|
|-
| St. Mary's Church
| 5,000
|
| 155,000
|
| 1343–1502
| Gdańsk 
| 
| Catholic (Latin) 
|
|-
| Holy Trinity Cathedral
| 5,000
|
| 137,000
|
| 1995–2004 
| Tbilisi 
| 
| Eastern Orthodox (Georgian) 
|
|-
| Winchester Cathedral
| 4,968
|
|
|
| 1079–1525 
| Winchester
| 
| Anglican (Church of England) 
| The longest Gothic cathedral in Europe
|-
| Notre Dame de Paris
| 4,800
| 5,500
|
| 9,000
| 1163–1345; 2019–present (reconstruction) 
| Paris 
| 
| Catholic (Latin) 
|Roof and main spire destroyed by fire on 15 April 2019 
|-
| Almudena Cathedral
| 4,800
|
|
|
| 1883–1993 
| Madrid
| 
| Catholic (Latin) 
| It has a north-south orientation instead of east-west.
|-
| Dresden Cathedral
| 4,800
|
|
|
| 1739–1755 
| Dresden
|  
| Catholic (Latin) 
| Largest church in all of Saxony
|-
| Basilica of St. Thérèse, Lisieux
| 4,500
|
|
|
| 1929–1954 
| Lisieux 
|  
| Catholic (Latin) 
|
|-
| Basilica de San Martin de Tours (Taal)
| 4,320
|
|
|
| 1856–1878 
| Taal, Batangas
| 
| Catholic (Latin) 
| Largest Catholic church in Asia
|-
| Ely Cathedral, Cambridgeshire
| 4,273
|
|
|
| 1083–1375 
| Ely
| 
| Anglican (Church of England) 
|
|-
| Frauenkirche
| 4,188
|
| 185,000–190,000
|
| 1468–1525
| Munich 
| 
| Catholic (Latin) 
|
|-
| Cathedral Basilica of the Sacred Heart
| 4,181
|
|
| 2,000
| 1898–1954
| Newark, New Jersey 
| 
| Catholic (Latin) 
|
|-
|-
| Se Cathedral
| 4,180
|
|
|
| 1619–1640
| Goa, India 
| 
| Catholic (Latin) 
|
|-
| St. Stephen's Basilica
| 4,147
|
|
|
| 1851–1906
| Budapest
| 
| Catholic (Latin) 
|
|-
| Cathedral Basilica of Saint Louis (St. Louis)
| 4,130
|
|
|
| 1907–1914 
| St. Louis 
| 
| Catholic (Latin) 
| Mosaics 7,700 square meters
|-
| Saint Isaac's Cathedral
| 4,000 +
| 7,000 
| 260,000 
|
| 1818–1858 
| Saint Petersburg 
| 
| Eastern Orthodox (Russian) 
| Built as a cathedral, now a museum
|-
| Cathedral of Christ the Saviour
| 3,980
| 6,829.3
| 101,992
| 9,500
| 1839–1883 
| Moscow 
| 
| Eastern Orthodox (Russian) 
| Rebuilt from 1995–2000
|-
| Saint Gregory the Illuminator Cathedral, Yerevan
| 3,822
|
|
|
| 1997–2001 
| Yerevan 
| 
| Oriental Orthodox (Armenian) 
|
|-
| Holy Name of Jesus Cathedral
| 3,820
|
|
|
| 2015–2018 
| Raleigh 
| 
| Catholic (Latin) 
|
|-
| Catedral Evangelica de Chile or Jotabeche Cathedral
| 3,714.91 
|
|
| 7,000
| 1967–1974
| Santiago de Chile
| 
| Protestant (Pentecostal)
| Largest capacity in Chile; national historic monument since 2013.
|-
| Church of Saint Sava
| 3,650
| 4,830
| 170,000
|
| 1935–1989
| Belgrade
| 
| Eastern Orthodox (Serbian)
| Largest church in the Balkans
|-
| Blessed Stanley Rother Shrine
| 3,512
|
|
| 1,859
| 2021–2022
| Oklahoma City
| 
| Catholic (Latin)
|
|-
|Uppsala Cathedral
|3,439
|4,077
|50,000 excluding towers
|2,200
|1273-1435
|Uppsala
|
|Church of Sweden
|Largest Cathedral in northern Europe. Height 118,7m, Length 118,95 m.
|-
| Yeonmudae Catholic Church
| 3,360
|
|  
|
| 2008–2009 
| Korea Army Training Center
| 
| Catholic (Latin) 
| The largest church in East Asia
|-
| Grace Cathedral
| 3,357
|
|  
|
| 1910–1964 
| San Francisco
| 
|Anglican (Episcopal Church in the U.S.)
|
|-
| Basilica of Saints Peter and Paul (Lewiston, Maine)
| 3,264
|
|
| 2,200
| 1906–1936
| Lewiston, Maine
| 
| Catholic (Latin)
| Largest church in the State of Maine, still serves mass in French.
|-
| Alexander Nevsky Cathedral
| 3,170
|
| 86,000
|
| 1882–1912 
| Sofia 
| 
| Eastern Orthodox (Bulgaria) 
|
|-
| Christ Cathedral
| 3,030
|
|
|
| 1977–1980
| Garden Grove, California
| 
| Catholic (Latin)
| Formerly known as the Crystal Cathedral. Consecrated as the Christ Cathedral
|-
| Westminster Abbey
| 2,972
|
|  
| 2,200
| 960– 
| London 
|  
| Anglican (Church of England) 
|
|-
| Sümi Baptist Church, Zünheboto
| 2,885
|
|  
| 8,500
| 2007–2017 
| Zunheboto, Nagaland 
|  
| Protestant (Baptist) 
|
|-
| St Andrew's Cathedral, Patras
| 2,600
|
|  
|
| 1908–1974 
| Patras
| 
| Eastern Orthodox (Greek) 
| 1,900 m2 on the ground floor and additionally 700 m2 on the first level (used as a gynaeconitis)
|-
| St. Patrick's Cathedral (Manhattan) 
| 2,500
|
| 
| 2,400
| 1858–1878
| New York City, New York 
|  
| Catholic (Latin) 
|
|-
| Beomeo Cathedral
| 2,463
|
|  
|
| 2013–2016 
| Daegu
| 
| Catholic (Latin) 
| 
|-
| Helsinki Cathedral
| 2,400
|
|  
| 1,300
| 1869–1887
| Helsinki
|  
| Protestant (Lutheran)
|
|-
| Cathedral Basilica of St. Francis of Assisi (Santa Fe)
| 2,322
|
|  
|
| 1869–1887
| Santa Fe, New Mexico 
|  
| Catholic (Latin) 
|
|-
| Our Lady of Dolours Syro-Malabar Catholic Basilica
| 2,300
|
|  
|
| 1929–2005 
| Thrissur
| 
| Catholic (Syro-Malabar) 
| It has the third tallest tower in Asia
|-
| St. John's Church, Seongnam
| 2,260
|
|  
|
| 1994–2002 
| Seongnam
| 
| Catholic (Latin) 
| Until 2009, largest church in East Asia
|-
| Basilica of St. John the Baptist
| 2,135
|
| 64,040
|
| 1839–1855
| St. John's 
| 
| Catholic (Latin) 
| 
|-
| St. Joseph Cathedral
| 2,125
|
|
|
| 1941
| San Diego
| 
| Catholic (Latin)
|
|}

See also 
 List of the largest evangelical church auditoriums
 List of Christian denominations by number of members
 List of tallest church buildings
 List of largest Eastern Orthodox church buildings
 List of tallest Eastern Orthodox church buildings
 List of tallest domes
 List of highest church naves
 Monumental crosses

Notes

References

Lists of churches
Churches, largest
Churches, largest
Churches